Robinson Bight was a settlement located on the east coast of Newfoundland, at Trinity Bay, Canada. It shares a name with the Bight at its location. It was first known as Pissing Mere, a local name for streams and waterfalls. It was the winter home for the Robinson family from Trinity, in the late 18th century. It was one of the first places to be settled on the northwest arm of Random Sound. It was later abandoned some time after 1889, and a new community was created close to the original site, acquiring the same name. There is no census data available for this locale today. The current region is an unincorporated community and is part of a Local Service District, although lately it has been considered a part of Hickman's Harbour occasionally appearing in documents under the heading Hickman's Harbour/Robinson's Bight. .

See also

 Random Island
 List of communities in Newfoundland and Labrador

References

Populated places in Newfoundland and Labrador
Bights (geography)